This is a complete list of ice hockey players who were drafted in the National Hockey League Entry Draft by the Colorado Avalanche franchise. It includes every player who was drafted, regardless of whether they played for the team. The Colorado Avalanche franchise was founded in Quebec, Canada, with the name Quebec Nordiques. In 1995, the franchise moved to Denver, Colorado, and since then has won two Stanley Cups.

Key
 Played at least one game with the Avalanche
 Spent entire NHL career with the Avalanche

Draft picks
Statistics are complete as of the 2021–22 NHL season and show each player's career regular season totals in the NHL.  Wins, losses, ties, overtime losses and goals against average apply to goaltenders and are used only for players at that position.

See also
List of Quebec Nordiques draft picks

References
General
 
 
Specific

draft
 
Colorado Avalanche